Hapoel Tel Aviv Basketball Club is an Israeli professional basketball club, based in Tel Aviv, Israel. Historically the second-most successful side in Israeli basketball with five national championships, the club is owned by Hapoel Tel Aviv Supporters Trust. The team was established in 1935, and plays in the Israeli Basketball Premier League and in EuroCup Basketball.

History
Hapoel Tel Aviv was founded in 1935, as part of the Tel Aviv branch of the "Hapoel" sports cooperative, the sports department of the Histadrut labor union, which was socialist and mostly Ashkenazi. The 15 years following the foundation of the Israeli national league in 1954 were the golden age in the club's history. During that time, it won most of its trophies. However, since then the club has failed to repeat its past success, and has watched as its bitter city rival, Maccabi Tel Aviv, beat them constantly in the race to trophies and European glory.

In 1980 the club inaugurated its home venue of Hapoel Arena at Ussishkin Street in the north of Tel Aviv in place of the open court that Hapoel had used for home games since 1953.Fall from Glory The new arena was named after the adjacent street bearing the name of Menachem Ussishkin, a famous Zionist leader. The uncomfortable conditions, along with the fact that Hapoel Tel Aviv's fans were considered among the most fanatic in Israeli sports, contributed to Ussishkin being known for an extremely hostile atmosphere for visiting teams.

In 1995 the Histadrut decided to suspend financial support of all its "Hapoel" sports teams, including Hapoel Tel Aviv. The club was sold to a group of private businessmen, and from 1998 until 2009 (with a short pause for the 2003–04 season), it was owned by Shaul Eizenberg, an Israeli businessman and former press officer of the Israel Football Association. Except for three years of financial support by Russian multi-millionaire Vladimir Gusinsky, Hapoel Tel Aviv has since consistently suffered from financial difficulties. The result of this was an immediate deterioration in the club's stability, which led to relegation to the second league in 1996–97, 1998–99, and 2005–06. During this period the club also conceded its most humiliating defeat of all time at the hands of local rivals Maccabi Tel Aviv by a staggering 54 points. This was part of a streak of nine defeats in one season to Maccabi Tel Aviv.

2005–06 season
In a controversial decision, Hapoel Tel Aviv decided to hold its home matches at Yad Eliyahu Arena. With its 10,383-seat capacity it had been recognized for years to be the home of rivals Maccabi Tel Aviv. The decision followed a statement by the club's owner Shaul Eizenberg that Hapoel Tel Aviv must move to a larger arena in order to repeat its past glory days. Also contributing to this decision was a change in policy of local police and municipal authorities. They declared the Ussishkin Arena to be unsafe, and announced plans to demolish it and build a boardwalk in place of the arena. The arena was demolished in 2007, despite a campaign by fans to preserve it.

In 2006 Eizenberg decided to stop funding the team, and thus Hapoel Tel Aviv started the season in the second division. The situation wasn't improved in the coming season, in which the team, built almost entirely of youth players, was relegated to the third division, winning only two games all season. Although the team managed to stay in the Israeli first league, it played the 2006–07 season in the second league due to lack of funds. The lack of funds and managerial disorders, as well as a completely new team based on youth players, led to finishing last in the second league and it was relegated to the third division at the end of that season.

Hapoel Ussishkin period (2007–10)

In June 2007 the new team was founded and registered in the Israeli 5th tier (Dan District). Hapoel Tel Aviv was owned and run by a supporters' trust with 1,800 registered paying members as of May 2011. The admission fee to the trust was 300 NIS as of May 2011. Besides voting rights in the trust's general assemblies, it also provides discount prices for club services such as a season ticket.

The team holds elections for the club's board every two years. In the second election in history on June 11, 549 voters decided to keep four of the current board members in place for another term, while electing as a fifth member Gilad Simchoni, the team's captain in recent years.

Hapoel Ussishkin, the new fan-owned and run team, was founded in July 2007 and registered in the Israeli Liga Bet Dan District (fifth tier), by supporters of Hapoel Tel Aviv B.C. following the club's relegation to the Israeli third tier, after years characterized by lack of financial support by the club's owner Eizenberg and poor management, which led it to bankruptcy, and finally relegation to the fourth tier, and the demolition of the Ussishkin Arena. In December 2009 the original men's senior team announced its disbandment followed by the fans team's trust buying the rights to Hapoel Tel Aviv B.C. brand through a third party. The name change was approved by the supporter trust in the following months, with the team promotion for the 2010–11 national league season.

2007–08 season - 
Backed with an astronomical budget in fifth-tier terms of over 300,000 NIS, the team finished its first season with a perfect record of 22–0 and qualified to the 4th division. The club also won another title by taking the Israeli 5th Division Union Cup, also without losing a single game.

2008–09 season - 
This season was also finished with a perfect record, 22–0, and the team qualified to the 3rd division. On April 30, 2009, the team won the Israeli 4th and 3rd Division Union Cup, winning over Hapoel Kfar Saba in the final game.

2009–10 season - 
Before the 2009–10 season started, it was decided that Hapoel Ussishkin would not play in the same district as Hapoel Tel Aviv, which played in the 3rd division as well, thus avoiding an intriguing match-up. The team qualified to Liga Leumit with a perfect record and won the Israeli 4th and 3rd Division Union Cup, winning over Elitzur Kohav-Yair/Keffar-Sabba in the final game.

Hapoel Ussishkin Honors
Liga Artzit  
Winners: 2010 
Liga Alef  
Winners: 2009 
Liga Bet  
Winners: 2008 
Association Cup 
Champions (2): 2009, 2010
Liga Bet Association Cup 
Champions (1): 2008

Players of the Year

The Player of the Year award is voted for by fans in time for the final home game of the season. Previous winners have been:

Hapoel Tel Aviv (2011–present)
At the end of 2009–10 season, Following the closing of the original Hapoel Tel Aviv club, the rights to the club name were purchased by an anonymous businessman, and were given to the Hapoel Ussishkin Management. The Management of Hapoel Ussishkin, following a member-wide voting process, decided to rename the club name back to its original name, Hapoel Tel Aviv. In the 2010–11 season, the club reached the semi-finals of the State Cup, before being knocked off by Elitzur Netanya. The club failed to achieve promotion to the first division at the end of the 2010–11 season, following a loss in the playoffs finals to B.C. Ha-Bika'a.

In the 2011–12 season Hapoel Tel Aviv finally achieved promotion to the First Division, following a playoff win over Maccabi Beér Yaacov, therefore returning to the top tier after six years, and being the first fan-owned club in Israel to participate in a top-tier league.

In 2014–17, Tamir Blatt played for the team. In March 2016, NBA star Nate Robinson signed with Hapoel Tel Aviv for the remainder of the season. Robinson led Hapoel Tel Aviv to the 8 seed and qualification for the playoffs. On May 19, Robinson scored 46 points in a quarter-final game against Hapoel Jerusalem. It was the most points scored in a playoff game since 1985.

Rivalries

Rivalry with Maccabi Tel Aviv
For years Hapoel and Maccabi Tel Aviv were considered the top two clubs of Israeli basketball. The Local derby matches between the two teams were always considered to be the most prestigious games in Israeli sports, and ones which led to a bitter atmosphere between fans of both clubs, often resulting in acts of mutual violence and hooliganism.

The tension between both clubs reached its peak in the 1980s. During this era they met for several times in the league's play-off finals and state cup finals. Probably the most famous meeting came in the best-of-three League Championship Finals in April 1985. Hapoel Tel Aviv won the first game in convincing fashion, leading by as much as 25 points late in the second half. Mike Largey always played well against Maccabi Tel Aviv, having beaten them five times in the four years that he played for Hapoel Tel Aviv. Prior to his arrival, Hapoel Tel Aviv had not beaten Maccabi Tel Aviv in 17 straight games.  The Hapoel Tel Aviv fans were very confident that this was their year to win the League Championship.  The second game started with Largey picking up where he left off from the first game.  Then, towards the beginning of the second half, after play had stopped for a loose ball foul, Maccabi Tel Aviv's Motti Aroesti shoved his hand into the face of Largey.  Largey responded immediately and threw Aroesti to the ground. Afterward, both players were ejected from the game and were automatically suspended from playing in Game 3.  Largey was far more valuable to Hapoel Tel Aviv then Aroesti was to Maccabi Tel Aviv and, not surprisingly, Maccabi Tel Aviv went on to win Games 2 and 3. To this day, most Hapoel Tel Aviv fans are convinced that Maccabi Tel Aviv planned this provocation as a way to deal with its nemesis. These matches are still regarded as of the most exciting in Israeli basketball history.

During the years as Maccabi Tel Aviv strengthened its dominance in Israeli basketball and its status as the almost-eternal champions, "Hapoel" fans accused their rival's management of various wrongful doing, including offering bribes to referees, signing contracts with rival players during the regular season and playoff series, and receiving exaggerated funds from state television for broadcasting rights. These accusations have never been proven true. With the decline of "Hapoel" in recent years the matches between both clubs became somewhat one-sided.

Players

Current roster

Depth chart

Notable players

 
  Haim Hazan 13 seasons: '53–'66
  Zvi Lubezki 15 seasons: '56–'71
  Rami Gutt 13 seasons: '59–'72
  Gershon Dekel 14 seasons: '61–'75
  Bill Wold 3 seasons: '66–'68
  Mark Torenshine 9 seasons: '68–'77
  Barry Leibowitz 11 seasons: '68–'69, '71–'82
  Ivan Leshinsky 4 seasons: '68–'71
  Dave Newmark 2 seasons: '73–'74, '77–'78
  Danny Bracha 11 seasons: '73–'84
  Pinchas Hozez 11 seasons: '74–'85
  John Willis 8 seasons: '76–'82, '84–'85, '86–'87
  Boaz Yanai 1 season: '79–'80
  LaVon Mercer 8 seasons: '80–'88
  Kenny Labanowski 4 seasons: '81–'85
  Amos Frishman 11 seasons: '81–'89, '90–'93
  Mike Largey 4 seasons: '83–'87
  Ofer Fleischer 6 seasons: '84–'87, '93–'95, '98–'99
  Shimon Amsalem 10 seasons: '85–'94, '98–'99
  Jon Dalzell 2 seasons: '87–'88, '91–'92
  Haim Zlotikman 2 seasons: '87–'88, '92–'93
  Linton Townes 2 seasons: '87–'89
  Howard Lassoff 3 seasons: '87–'90
  Dennis Williams 2 seasons: '88–'90
  Keith Bennett 3 seasons: '88–'91
  James Terry 4 seasons: '88–'89, '90–'91, '94–'96
  Derrick Hamilton 1 season: '89
  Mike Gibson 1 season: '90
  David Henderson 1 season: '90–'91
  Doug Lee 1 season: '91–'92
  Purvis Short 1 season: '91–'92
  David Thirdkill 3 seasons: '91–'94
  Tomer Steinhauer 3 seasons: '91–'94
  Terry Fair 1 season: '92–'93
  Radenko Dobraš 3 seasons: '92–'93, '95, '00–'01
  Lior Arditi  2 seasons: '93–'95
  Meir Tapiro 2 seasons: '94–'96
  Buck Johnson 1 season: '94–'95
  Milt Wagner 1 season: '94–'95
  Nenad Marković 1 season: '95–'96
  Gil Mossinson 6 seasons: '95–'98, '02–'03, '04–'06
  Kevin Bradshaw 3 seasons: '96–'99
  Dror Hagag 3 seasons: '01–'04
  Cedric Ceballos 1 season: '02
  Chris King 1 season: '02–'03
  Billy Keys 1 season: '02–'03
  Nikola Bulatović 1 season: '02–'03
  Yaniv Green 2 seasons: '02–'04
  Matan Naor 12 seasons: '02–'04, '07–'17
  Virginijus Praškevičius 1 season: '03–'04
  Jasmin Hukić 1 season: '03–'04
  Michael Wright 1 season: '03–'04
  William Avery 1 season: '04
  Samo Udrih 1 season: '04–'05
  Kenny Williams 1 season: '04–'05
  Marcus Hatten 1 season: '05–'06
  Jeron Roberts 1 season: '05–'06
  Bar Timor 4 seasons: '11–'13, '20-present
  Curtis Kelly 3 seasons: '11–'13, '15
  Jonathan Skjöldebrand 4 seasons: '11–'15
  Jeff Allen 3 seasons: '12–'13, '15–'16, '17
  Brian Randle 1 season: '13
  Carlon Brown 1 season: '13–'14
  Raviv Limonad 6 seasons: '13–'19
  Yancy Gates 1 season: '14–'15
  Durand Scott 1 season: '14–'15
  Tamir Blatt 3 seasons: '14–'17
  Tre Simmons 1 season: '15–'16
  Nate Robinson 1 season: '16
  Mark Lyons 2 seasons: '16–'17, '19–present
  Alando Tucker 1 season: '16–'17
  Adrian Banks 2 seasons: '16–'18
  Richard Howell 2 seasons: '16–'17, '18–'19
  Tomer Ginat 4 seasons: '16–present
  Tony Gaffney 1 season: '17–'18
  Jerel McNeal 2 seasons: '17–'19
  Jamal Shuler 1 season: '18–'19

 David Kaminsky
 Shamuel Nachmias
 Ari Rosenberg
 Ami Shelef
 Ofer Yaakobi

Season by season

Managerial history

Ami Shelef (1936-1988)

Staff

Honors
Total titles: 9

Domestic 
Israeli League
 Winners (5): 1959–60, 1960–61, 1964–65, 1965–66, 1968–69
Israeli Cup
 Winners (4): 1961–62, 1968–69, 1983–84, 1992–93

Lower divisions competitions
Israeli National League 
Champions: 1998, 2002, 2012

European 
FIBA Korać Cup
 Semifinalist (2): 1979–80, 1987–88
 FIBA EuroChallenge 
 Semifinalist (1): 2003–04

Regional competitions
Balkan League
Final-Four: 2012

Former managers

 
 Yehoshua Rozin
 Ralf Klein
 Zvika Sherf
 Erez Edelstein
 Haim Hazan
Moshe Weinkrantz

See also
List of fan-owned sports teams

References

External links
Official website (in Hebrew)
Unofficial Blog in English
Hapoel Tel Aviv  Safsal.co.il coverage

 
Hapoel Tel Aviv
Tel Aviv
Basketball teams established in 1935
Tel Aviv B.C.
Liga Leumit (basketball) teams
1935 establishments in Mandatory Palestine